Earthdawn is a fantasy role-playing game, originally produced by FASA in 1993. In 1999 it was licensed to Living Room Games, which produced the Second Edition. It was licensed to RedBrick in 2003, who released the Classic Edition in 2005 and the game's Third Edition in 2009 (the latter through Mongoose Publishing's Flaming Cobra imprint). The license is now held by FASA Games, Inc. (from FASA), who have released the Fourth Edition, with updated mechanics and an advanced metaplot timeline. Vagrant Workshop released the Age of Legend edition in 2016 using alternative rules-lite mechanics.

The game is similar to fantasy games like Dungeons & Dragons, but draws more inspiration from games like RuneQuest. The rules of the game are tightly bound to the underlying magical metaphysics, with the goal of creating a rich, logical fantasy world. Like many role-playing games from the nineties, Earthdawn focuses much of its detail on its setting, a province called Barsaive. It was also originally written as a prequel to Shadowrun, mirroring its setting of returning magic with one where magic has just recently dropped from its peak. However, after Shadowrun was licensed out to a different publisher the ties between the two were deliberately severed (See Setting) and remain so.

History
Starting in 1993, FASA released over 20 gaming supplements describing this universe; however, it closed down production of Earthdawn in January 1999. During that time several novels and short-story anthologies set in the Earthdawn universe were also released. In late 1999, FASA granted Living Room Games a licensing agreement to produce new material for the game.

The Second Edition did not alter the setting, though it did update the timeline to include events that took place in Barsaive. There were a few changes to the rules in the Second Edition; some classes were slightly different or altered abilities from the original. The changes were meant to allow for more rounded characters and better balance of play. Living Room Games last published in 2005 and they no longer have a license with FASA to publish Earthdawn material.

In 2003 a second license was granted to RedBrick, who developed their own edition based on the FASA products, in addition to releasing the original FASA books in PDF form. The Earthdawn Classic Player's Compendium and Earthdawn Classic Gamemaster's Compendium are essentially an alternative Second Edition, but without a version designation (since the material is compatible anyway). Each book has 524 pages and summarizes much of what FASA published—not only the game mechanics, but also the setting, narrations, and stories. For example, each Discipline has its own chapter, describing it from the point of view of different adepts. Likewise, Barsaive gets a complete treatment, and the chapters contain a lot of log entries and stories in addition to the setting descriptions; the same applies to Horrors and Dragons. Errata was incorporated into the text, correcting previous edition errors and providing rules clarifications.

While RedBrick tried to remain faithful to FASA's vision and visual style, they revised almost everything and introduced new material to fill the gaps. RedBrick began publishing new Earthdawn novels in 2007. In 2009, RedBrick announced the Third Edition of the game. To gain a larger audience for this edition, RedBrick published the book through Mongoose Publishing's Flaming Cobra imprint. The first two books were released in July 2009. In 2012, RedBrick ceased publishing and announced the transfer of the Earthdawn license to FASA Games, Inc.

In 2014, FASA Games announced the forthcoming publication of Earthdawn Fourth Edition and launched a successful Kickstarter to support the project. Fourth Edition is described as a reworking of the game mechanics, with redundancies eliminated, and a simpler success level system. The game world is advanced five years, past the end of the Barsaive-Thera War, in order to clear dangling threads in the metaplot and open the game world to new stories. The first Fourth Edition title—the Player's Guide—was released in early 2015. In 2014 FASA Corporation also gave permission for Impact Miniatures to return the original Heartbreaker Hobbies & Games Official Earthdawn Miniatures range to production. In order to fund this, Impact Miniatures launched a successful Kickstarter project.

In 2016, Vagrant Workshop released the Age of Legend edition using a permutation of the rules-lite mechanics of the Freeform Universal RPG system. With its rules-lite mechanics the Age of Legend edition is marketed as being "ideal for one-shots, convention games, and introductory games — even for kids!"

Setting
In Barsaive, magic, like many things in nature, goes through cycles. As the magic level rises, it allows alien creatures called Horrors to cross from their distant, otherworldly dimension into our own. The Horrors come in an almost infinite variety—from simple eating machines that devour all they encounter, to incredibly intelligent and cunning foes that feed off the negative emotions they inspire in their prey.

In the distant past of Earthdawns setting, an elf scholar discovered that the time of the Horrors was approaching, and founded the Eternal Library in order to discover a way to defeat them — or at the very least, survive them. The community that grew up around the library developed wards and protections against the Horrors, which they traded to other lands and eventually became the powerful Theran Empire, an extremely magically advanced civilization and the main antagonist of the Earthdawn setting.

The peoples of the world built kaers, underground towns and cities, which they sealed with the Theran wards to wait out the time of the Horrors, which was called the Scourge. Theran wizards and politicians warned many of the outlying nations around Thera of the coming of the Horrors, offering the protection of the kaers to those who would pledge their loyalty to the Empire. Most of these nations agreed at first though some became unwilling to fulfill their end of the bargain after the end of the Scourge, wanting to have nothing to do with the bureaucratic nation run on political conflict and powered by slavery. After four hundred years of hiding, the Scourge ended, and the people emerged to a world changed by the Horrors. The player characters explore this new world, discovering lost secrets of the past, and fighting Horrors that remain.

The primary setting of Earthdawn is Barsaive, a former province of the Theran Empire. Barsaive is a region of city-states, independent from the Therans since the dwarven Kingdom of Throal led a rebellion against their former overlords. The Theran presence in Barsaive has been limited to a small part of south-western Barsaive, located around the magical fortress of Sky Point and the city of Vivane.

The setting of Earthdawn is the same world as Shadowrun (i.e. a fictionalized version of Earth), but takes place millennia earlier. The map of Barsaive and its neighboring regions established that most of the game takes place where Ukraine and Russia are in our world. However, the topography other than coastlines and major rivers is quite different, and the only apparent reference to the real world besides the map may be the Blood Wood, known as "Wyrm Wood" before the Scourge and similar in location and extent to the Chernobyl (Ukrainian for "wormwood") zone of alienation. Note should be made that game world links between Earthdawn and Shadowrun were deliberately broken by the publisher when the Shadowrun property was licensed out, in order to avoid the necessity for coordination between publishing companies. FASA has announced since then, that there are no plans to return Shadowrun to in-house publication, nor to restore the links between the game worlds.

Two Earthdawn supplements cover territories outside Barsaive. The Theran Empire book (First Edition) covers the Theran Empire and its provinces (which roughly correspond to the territories of the Roman Empire, plus colonies in America and India). Cathay: The Five Kingdoms (Third Edition) covers the lands of Cathay (Far East).

Races
The setting of Earthdawn features several fantasy races for characters and NPCs:

 Dwarf: Dwarfs in Earthdawn are similar in appearance to the classic D&D or Tolkien dwarfs. They are the predominant race in Barsaive, and the dwarf language is considered the common language. Their culture, especially of the dominant Throal Kingdom, can be considered more of a Renaissance-level culture than in most other fantasy settings, and forms the main source of resistance to a return of Thera's rule in Barsaive.
 Elf: Elves in Earthdawn fit the common fantasy role playing convention; they are tall, lithe, pointy-eared humanoids who prefer living in nature. Elves in Earthdawn naturally live a very long time; some are thought to be immortal. Such immortal Elves feature in many cross-pollinated storylines with Shadowrun. A subrace of Earthdawn elves are called the Blood Elves. The blood elves rejected the Theran protective magic, and attempted their own warding spells. These wards failed, and a last-ditch ritual caused thorns to thrust through the skin of the blood elves. These ever-bleeding wounds caused constant pain, but the self-inflicted suffering was enough to protect the blood elves from the worst of the Horrors.
 Human: Humans in Earthdawn are physically similar to humans in our own real world. Human adepts are granted a special Versatility talent to make them more mechanically appealing. Humans in Earthdawn are considered to be somewhat warlike in general outlook.
 Obsidiman: Obsidimen are a race of large, rock-based humanoids. Their primary connection is to their Liferock, which is a large formation of stone that they emerge from. Obsidimen are loyal to the community around their Liferock, and eventually return to and re-merge with it. Obsidimen can live around 500 years away from their Liferock, and their ultimate lifespan is unknown, as they generally return to it and remain there. Due to their rocky nature and long lives, obsidimen are rather slow moving and deliberate in both speech and action, and can have difficulty understanding the smaller races' need for haste. However, if aroused by a threat to self, friend, or community, obsidimen are fearsome to behold.
 Ork: The ork race in Earthdawn is physically similar to other depictions of orcs in fantasy role-playing. They are tribal, nomadic and often barbaric humanoids, with olive, tan, beige or ebony skin. They are relatively short-lived, and as a result many attempt to leave a legacy marked by a memorable death—preferably one that leaves no corpse. Before the Scourge almost all orks were enslaved by other races.
 Troll: The troll race in Earthdawn is also similar in appearance to many other fantasy role playing depictions of trolls. They are very tall humanoids, with a hardened skin and horns. Socially, they form clans to which they are fiercely loyal. Troll clans often raid one another, and a significant subset of the troll race are crystal raiders, which command many of the airships of Barsaive. Other trolls, known as lowland trolls, have merged with mixed communities around Barsaive, although most retain the fierce cultural and personal pride of their less-civilized cousins.
 T'skrang: The t'skrang are lizard-like amphibious humanoids with long tails and a flair for dramatics. Many of them exhibit the behaviors and characteristics which are stereotypical to a "swashbuckler". T'skrang are often sailors, and many t'skrang families run ships up and down the rivers of Barsaive. A rare subrace of t'skrang, the k'stulaami, possess a flap of skin much like a flying squirrel's patagium, allowing them to glide. While k'stulaami can be born as a random mutation in any t'skrang line, they tend to congregate into communities filled with their own kind.
 Windling: The windlings are small, winged humanoids; similar to many depictions of fae creatures, they resemble small elves with insect-like wings. They have the ability to see into the astral plane, and are considerably luckier than the other races. Windlings are often somewhat mischievous, hedonistic, and eager for new experiences, and are culturally similar to the Kender of Krynn, but without the same kleptomaniacal tendencies. They have wings similar to those of a dragonfly and are one to two feet in height.
 Leafer: A race native to the Dark Forest of Vasgothia, leafers are sentient plant people.
 Ulkmen: Another race unique to Vasgothia, the ulkmen have been merged with Horrors. In addition to their talents, an ulkman adepts gain a Horror power every four Circles. Despite their origins & horrific appearance, the ulkmen are a largely peaceful people.
 Jubruq: The only 'half-race' in Earthdawn, jubruq are half human or ork and half elemental spirit. They are native to the Sufik tribes of Marak.
 Jackelmen: Native to Creana, jackalmen have the body of a human and the head of a jackal. They are a warrior people and are thought to practice cannibalism.

Political entities

Barsaive
Barsaive was once one of the Theran Empire's many provinces but a series of post-Scourge wars between Thera and various city-states of Barsaive have seen the former province secure its independence. Barsaive's people and governments represent a varied number of individual powers.
Kingdom of Throal (dwarfs, monarchy)
Iopos (city state, autocracy)
Blood Wood (elves, monarchy)
Kratas (city of thieves, kleptocracy)
Urupa (city-state, important port)
Jerris (city-state)
Travar (city-state)
Troll clans of mountains (Raiders)
T'skrang clans (Aropagoi) of the Serpent River (traders)
Vivane (city-state, under occupation by Thera)
Haven and Parlainth (ruins)
Great Dragons
Various secret societies

Provinces of the Theran Empire 
Creana: An ancient land far to the South of Barsaive, Creana was once a mighty empire when Thera was still in its infancy. Ruled over by living Passion known as the Pharon, Creana is plagued by magical multi-coloured sandstorms and Horror-corruputed Mummies. Creana also includes several conquered cities from other parts of the Selestrean Basin including the Ulustan city of Okonopolis and Issyr as well as cities from deeper within Fekara such as Nuboz.
Indrisa: Thera's newest province, Indrisa was discovered just before the Scourge. A land rich in resources and culture, the Indrisans have a complicated relationship with their Passions, who often send powerful creatures called Dhuna to punish those that transgress against them. Indrisa survived the Scourge using an ancient magical method that harnessed positive energy against the Horrors.
Marac: A land of polished brass towers where science is as praised as magic, Marac is currently in the grip of a bloody revolt known as the Jinari Rebellion. The Sufik tribes of the desert have discovered how to control Horrors and have weaponized them against the invading Therans.
Rugaria: The lands immediately north of Thera, Rugaria is one of the empire's earliest provinces. The people of Rugaria are described as grim and dour and submitted to Theran rule without much resistance.
Talea: Talea is a province of political intrigue and bizarre religious practices. Dozens of Dukes and Kings make war upon each other whilst waiting for the birth of Prima – the Passion yet to be.
Vasgothia: The empire's most western province, Vasgothia is where the Therans produce their crops that feed their vast empire, it is also home to savage tribes that hate the empire deeply. Vasgothia survived the Scourge because its Passions fought directly against the Horrors, dying in the process. The Scourge has affected Vasgothia is drastic ways, producing dozens of magical oddities in the process.
Vivane: The lands around the city of Vivane are also known as Vivane province. Whilst not a true province in an administrative or geographical sense, this portion of Southwest Barsaive is an important bulwark between Rugaria and those rebellions nations found in Barsaive proper.

Other Lands 
The Western Kingdoms / Gwydenro: One of the Elven Nations, the Gwydenro once spread throughout the entire Roheline Wood, but the area was destroyed during the Scourge and it is now known as The Wastes. The Gwydenro consists of dozens of kingdoms known as gerryth that are bound together by the oaths of the lew teryn. The largest and most powerful kingdom is Sereatha – The City of Spires.
Shosara: Another Elven Nation, Shosara was formally separated from the Elven Court in pre-Scourge times for adopting Human culture. Largely isolated from the rest of the world, Shosara is a culture of seafarers and traders with a 'relaxed' attitude to the Theran Empire.
Arancia: An independent nation next to the Theran province of Talea, very little is known or written about Arcancia. (This land will be explored fully in the upcoming 4th edition regional source-book; Arancia)
The Slithering Wastes: The name given to a large region west of Arancia and north of Marac. Very little is known about the Slithering Wastes, but presumably it suffered greatly during the Scourge, leading to its current name.
Aznan: A land located to the south of Creana, Aznan is renowned for its huge Cloud Mountain and various medicinal plants that possess magical properties.
Aruacania: Aruacania lies to the far west of the Theran Empire and is a land of Feathered Dragons and unknown magical mysteries.
Fekara: The name of the continent where Creana, Marac, Nuboz and Aznan are located.
Cathay: A large and powerful group of kingdoms to the far East of Indrisa, Cathay was fully explored in Earthdawn: Third Edition with the Cathay: Player's Guide & Cathay: Gamemaster's Guide.

Magic in Earthdawn
Earthdawn'''s magic system is highly varied but the essential idea is that all player characters (called Adepts) have access to magic, used to perform abilities attained through their Disciplines.

Each Discipline is given a unique set of Talents which are used to access the world's magic. Legend points (the Earthdawn equivalent of experience points) can be spent to put up the characters level in the Talent, increasing his step level for the ability, making the user more proficient at using that specific type of magic.

Caster Disciplines use the same Talent system as others, but also have access to spells. How a player character obtains spells varies depending on his Game Master; but how they are used is universal. Casters all have special Talents called spell matrixes which they can place spells into. A spell attuned (placed into) to a matrix is easily accessible and can be cast at any time. Spells can be switched at the players will while out of combat. Once engaged in combat, however, they must use an action to do so (called re-attuning on the fly), which requires a set difficulty they must achieve, or risk losing their turn.

It is generally recommended that Casters only use attuned spells, but this is not required. Casting a spell that is not in a matrix is referred to as raw casting. Raw casting is perhaps the most dangerous aspect of the Earthdawn magic system. If the spell is successfully cast, it has its normal effects along with added consequences. Raw casting has a very good chance of drawing the attention of a Horror, which can quickly turn into death for low level characters (and for high level characters as well in some cases).

One of the most innovative ideas in Earthdawn is how magical items work. At first, most magical items work exactly like a mundane item of the same type. As a character searches for information about the item's history, performs certain tasks relating to that history, and spends legend points to activate the item, he unlocks some of the magic in the item. As the character learns more about the item and its history, he can unlock more and more power within the item.

Each magical item, therefore, is unique by virtue of its history and the scope of its powers. For example, one magical broadsword may have only 4 magical ranks and only increases the damage of the blade. On the other hand, the legendary sword Purifier, has 10 magical ranks and grants its wielder numerous powers.

Game mechanicsEarthdawn stands out from other tabletop RPGs with a unique approach to skill tests. Players wanting to perform an action determine their level or "step" for the skill, talent, or ability to be used. This step can then be looked up in a list of dice to be thrown; it is the next-highest integer of the average roll of the dice(s) in question. For example, two six-sided dice will on average yield a result of 7, thus the step number 8 means that 2d6 will be rolled. The consequence is that each such dice roll has a 50% chance of yielding a result at least as high as the corresponding step number.

The result of each die is added (dice which reach their maximum value are thrown again, adding each maximum to the tally, along with the final result below maximum) and compared to a value decided by the game master/storyteller according to the difficulty of the task. This approach means it's always technically possible to succeed with a low step number, yet leaves room for failure on high step numbers. This will sometimes make combat last longer than in other games. As per the above, the difficulty value where the odds of success are perfectly even is identical to the step number.

The dice in steps 3 through 13 form the basis of an 11-Step cycle. To form Steps 14–24, add 1d20. To form Steps 25–35, further add 1d10 + 1d8. For higher cycles, continue alternating between the addition of 1d20 and 1d10 + 1d8. Step 2 is rolled as Step 3, but you subtract 1 from the result. This is notated as "1d4 – 1". Step 1 is 1d4 – 2.

The 3rd edition changes this by removing d4s and d20s from the system. Steps 6 through 12 (as listed above) form the basis of a 7-Step cycle. To add 7 Steps from then on, simply add 1d12.

The 4th edition changes this by making Steps 8 through 18 form the basis of an 11-Step cycle. To form Steps 19–29, add 1d20. To form Steps 30–41, add 2d20, and so on.

The Age of Legend edition departs from the Step System mechanics of previous Earthdawn editions and instead uses a permutation of the rules-lite mechanics of the Freeform Universal RPG system by Nathan Russell. In the Age of Legend permutation a six-sided die ("d6") is used with "but..." and "and..." situational modifiers added to four of the six die faces, and conditionally up to six additional Fudge dice of two differing colors which can alter the initial result of the main d6 die. (Alternatively, the Age of Legend edition can be played with just seven standard d6 dice, ideally of three differing colors.)  Dice rolls in the Age of Legend edition answer closed yes-no questions, with the default question being "Do you get what you want?" subsequent to a character's attempt to elicit a desired outcome.

Reception
Chris W. McCubbin reviewed Earthdawn in Pyramid #3 (Sept./Oct., 1993), and stated that "Although it never becomes bogged down in cliches and avoids outmoded concepts, Earthdawn is, at heart, a very traditional heroic fantasy RPG."

In the February 1994 edition of Dragon (Issue 202), Rick Swan liked the high production values "highlighted by striking illustrations and FASA’s usual state-of-the-art graphics", and found that "Thanks to clear writing and sensible organization... it's an easy read." But Swan also found the game setting insubstantial compared to others. "Despite workable rules and a clever setting, Earthdawn is more frosting than cake, with little of substance to distinguish it from the competition." Nevertheless, he found himself drawn to the game. "In a greasy pizza, let’s-not-take-this-too-seriously kind of way, Earthdawn holds its own."

In a 1996 reader poll conducted by Arcane magazine to determine the 50 most popular roleplaying games of all time, Earthdawn was ranked 24th. Editor Paul Pettengale commented: "Very good indeed. Earthdawn combined traditional fantasy with Call of Cthulhu-style horror and a detailed background to create an evocative and interesting setting. Combined with a clear, well-designed rules system and an impressive range of supporting supplements and adventures, this is an excellent fantasy game. It's also of special interest to fans of Shadowrun, because it describes the past of the same gameworld."
In 1999 Pyramid magazine named Earthdawn as one of The Millennium's Most Underrated Games. Editor Scott Haring noted (referring to the FASA edition) that "Earthdawn had an original, inventive magic system (no mean trick given the hundreds of fantasy RPGs that came before), and a game world that gave you the classic "monsters and dungeons" sort of RPG experience, but made sense doing it."

ReviewsWhite Wolf #37 (July/Aug., 1993)Shadis #10 (Dec., 1993)Shadis #24 (Feb., 1996)Pyramid – Second EditionRollespilsmagasinet Fønix (Danish) (Issue 1 – March/April 1994)Envoyer'' (German) (Issue 62 – Dec 2001)

Publications

References

External links
 Earthdawn.com (Vagrant Workshop)
 FASA Games, Inc. Earthdawn Homepage
 Ulisses Spiele, 4. Edition Earthdawn
 Internet Archive of FASA's official Earthdawn page

 
Role-playing games introduced in 1993
Fantasy role-playing games